

Buildings and structures

Buildings

 c.1290–97 – Merton College Chapel (choir) in Oxford built
 1290 – Orvieto Cathedral, Umbria by Arnolfo di Cambio begun
 1292 – Great Coxwell Barn in England built
 1293 – Hôpital de Notre-Dame de Fontenilles, Tonnerre, Burgundy, begun
 1295 – Beaumaris Castle by Master James of Saint George on Anglesey in Wales begun
 1296
 Florence Cathedral (Il Duomo di Firenze) by Arnolfo di Cambio begun
 Basilica of Santa Croce, Florence by Arnolfo di Cambio begun
 1299 – Eşrefoğlu Mosque in Beyşehir, Anatolia, completed

References

Architecture